Ward Run is a  long 1st order tributary to Harmon Creek in Washington County, Pennsylvania.

Course
Ward Run rises about 1.5 miles southwest of Florence, Pennsylvania, and then flows south to join Harmon Creek at Hanlin Station.

Watershed
Ward Run drains  of area, receives about 40.4 in/year of precipitation, has a wetness index of 334.15, and is about 78% forested.

See also
List of rivers of Pennsylvania

References

Rivers of Pennsylvania
Rivers of Washington County, Pennsylvania